The Sunshine Millions Oaks is an American race for thoroughbred horses held in January as part of the eight-race Sunshine Millions series. Run at Santa Anita Park in Arcadia, California or at Gulfstream Park in Hallandale Beach, Florida, half the eight-race series is run at one track and half at the other.

Open to three-year-old fillies willing to race six furlongs on the dirt, the Sunshine Millions Oaks is an ungraded stakes event but carries a purse of $250,000. Inaugurated at seven furlongs in 2003, the race is also known as the Ocala Stud Oaks (in 2006).

In its eighth running in 2010, the series of races called the Sunshine Millions are restricted to horses bred either in Florida or in California and is the brainchild of the Thoroughbred Owners of California, the California Thoroughbred Breeders Association, the Florida Thoroughbred Breeders' and Owners' Association, Inc., Santa Anita Park, Gulfstream Park, and Magna Entertainment Corp.

Winners

References
 Official site of the Sunshine Millions
 The Sunshine Millions Oaks at Pedigree Query

Restricted stakes races in the United States
Horse races in Florida
Horse races in California
Flat horse races for three-year-old fillies